Criticism of globalization is skepticism of the claimed benefits of globalization. Many of these views are held by the anti-globalization movement. Globalization has created much global and internal unrest in many countries. While the dynamics of capitalism is changing and each country is unique in its political makeup, globalization is a set-in-stone "program" that is difficult to implement without political unrest. Globalization can be partly responsible for the current global economic crisis. Case studies of Thailand and the Arab nations' view of globalization show that globalization is a threat to culture and religion, and it harms indigenous people groups while multinational corporations profit from it. Although globalization has promised an improved standard of living and economic development, it has been heavily criticized for its production of negative effects. Globalization is not simply an economic project, but it also heavily influences the country environmentally, politically, and socially as well.

Economic impacts

Global Economic Crisis 
The Global Economic Crisis, the worst financial crisis since the Great Depression, can be partially attributed to globalization. Although globalization promised an improved standard of living, it has actually worsened the financial situation of many homes and has made the financial crisis global through the influences of international financial institutions such as the World Bank. Globalization limits development and civilization to a path that only leads to a Western and capitalistic system. Because of the political and structural differences in countries, the implementation of globalization has been detrimental for many countries.

Wage Inequality 

That is not to say that there is no link between globalization and economic inequality. In fact, studies have shown a rise in economic inequality at the same time as a rise in globalization in the 1990s. Because of this, more people attributed this shift to globalization entirely, causing more and more of the general population to criticize globalization in general.

Unemployment 
Additionally, there is an argument about the effects of globalization on jobs. With globalization comes less domestic production of everyday goods. When consumers look to purchase a product, they are going to typically purchase the one that costs less money, and sometimes US-made products are unable to keep up with the prices of foreign goods.

It was found in a study done in 2013 that the Chinese import competition led to a loss of employment for 548,000 workers between 1990 and 2000. Especially recently, many countries have seen a decline in factory and production work, which leaves many people without jobs. Those who criticize globalization attribute this decline in jobs to the fact that there are so many competitors in the market, especially foreign ones. Overall it is much more difficult for domestic workers and companies to thrive when foreign prices remain cheaper and much more competitive.

Political impacts

Globalization as American hegemony 
English Philosopher John Gray described globalization as post-Cold War American triumphalism, and stated "global laissez-faire is an American project". Gray points out that the American system of Globalization is past its prime and is no longer sustainable in the modern world. Globalization in the United States began with the common goal of forming a global collective that facilitates a steady stream of trade, internationalism, and collaboration in various sectors to promote peace and prosperity. Some scholars and critics say the Washington Consensus played a role in solidifying the United States as one of the core nation-states at the heart of the system of global capitalism in the post-Cold War era. However, this system has been openly criticized by some, mainly by examination of the United States today. In the United States, there are high levels of economic and social inequalities feeding an ever-growing disparity between the upper and lower class. Furthermore, the United States has the single highest rate of incarcerations, one of the highest GINI scores of income inequality, and a great deal of economic uncertainty sweeping the nation.

One of the many criticisms that follows is that the influence of the American system on other countries may reproduce these negative effects. Other critics argue that globalization is hurting the domestic economy rather than foreign states under its influence. Namely, former United States President Donald Trump, who announced he felt that America had lost its former high regard and had become a laughing stock on the world stage. He openly voiced these opinions during a U.N. General Assembly stating "We reject globalism and embrace the doctrine of patriotism”. This was the intro to a tirade on globalization's harmful effects and a defense on the withdrawal of the United States from various U.N. councils. More broadly, many Americans have a feeling of being forgotten or swept up by globalization and its lasting effects, according to a survey conducted by the Pew Research Center. According to the survey, these feelings were brought on by the rising cost of living, culture shifts, industry decline, and the rising influence of multinational corporations.

Power of transnational corporations 
In the process of implementing globalization in developing countries, the selection of winners and losers is often predetermined. Multinational corporations often benefit from globalization while poor, indigenous locals are negatively affected and often exploited. The power of transnational companies inflicts a major threat for indigenous tribes and other small colonies residing in larger nations opting towards globalization. Transnational companies exploit the local land and resources of the families belonging to these tribes for their businesses. An example of this occurring is large palm oil companies receiving land to develop from the government that is occupied by the indigenous tribes. This has led to massive deforestation and a silent human rights crisis. Globalization can be seen as a new form of colonization or imperialism, as economic inequality and the rise in unemployment have followed with its implementation. Globalization has been criticized for benefiting those who are already large and in power at the cost of endangering the countries’ indigenous population. Furthermore, globalization is non-democratic, as it is enforced through top-down methods. In the name of free markets and with the promise of an improved standard of living, local authorities give up some of their political and social powers to international organizations. Thus, globalization causes the greater empowerment of these international organizations and the diminishing influence of local state institutions.

Environmental impacts

Case study of Thailand’s Pak Mun River 
In the late 1970s and 1980s, hydropower dam projects were conducted in order to recreate Thailand's economy into an export-oriented economy. The projects were funded by loans from the World Bank and was part of globalization efforts. The local villagers whom the project would directly affect were not notified, and the World Bank disregarded their concerns. As a result of the building of the dams, villages that heavily depended on the river lost their livelihood and their means of economic gains (i.e., fishing). The projects contaminated the river, which made the river unfit for villagers to drink, bathe, and do laundry without experiencing negative health conditions such as rashes. Furthermore, the projects resulted in the extinction of 40 edible plant species, 45 mushroom species, and 10 bamboo species, all of which the income of the local markets were dependent on, some of which were important for medical usage. Furthermore, the decline in fish population exterminated fishermen's ways of life, as 169 different fish species were affected and 56 species became extinct. The globalization efforts in Thailand resulted in environmental impacts that affected the social and economic welfare of indigenous populations.

Decreased Biodiversity 
Human activities largely attribute to the world's expanding decrease in biodiversity; human impact on ecosystems can be measured by biological diversity. Harmful effects from globalization are visible from reduced genetic diversity in agriculture from the loss of crop varieties and livestock breeds, loss of biological species, increase of "exotic species" which live outside their natural geographic range, pollution in Earth's natural elements such as air, water, soil, rapid climate change, exhaustion of resources, and social or spiritual disruption.

Agricultural effects have been documented for all food plants from vegetables, grains, and tree tops. Since 1970, over a thousand independent seed companies have been purchased by pharmaceutical, petrochemical, and other transnational corporations. As transnationals drop all but the profitable seed varieties there is a significant loss of germ plasm. The Garden Seed Inventory has listed all commercially available, non-hybrid vegetable varieties in the United States and Canada, and shows that beet roots, cabbage, and broccoli will diminish as a result of globalization faster than per capita income increases.

Loss of domestic livestock including the ever-diminishing Haiti Creole Pigs also demonstrates the pressures of globalization. They were nearly killed off due to a disease control effort to "integrate Haiti into the hemispheric economy." There were efforts to try replacing the pigs with those from Iowa from the United States, but the costly project was a failure since the pigs needs could not be met leading to Haiti suffering a US$600 million loss.

Animal Livelihood Threats 
Extinction rates exceed usual rates in the 21st century than ever in evolutionary history. In the second half of the 20th century and the beginning of the 21st, global trade and expansion was growing rapidly; however, this increase in new technology and exploitation of natural areas has led to a species lost comparable to the great extinctions of early geological times. The United Nations Food and Agriculture Organization (FAO) warns that corporations have prioritized high-output breeds over gene pools that could ensure future food security; about 20 percent of domestic animals are near-extinction, with a breed lost each month. Of the 7,600 FAO breeds logged in the farm animal genetics resources, 190 have gone extinct in the past 15 years with another 1,500 species at risk of extinction. Globalization of livestock markets is one of the largest factor affecting animal livelihood.

The factors resulting in habitat destruction can be narrowed down to: exploitations of populations and natural areas for production or trade, increased housing, agriculture, overfishing, road building, mining, and dam construction. There are also subtle effects of globalization on wild species, expansions of ecotourism-based industries, changes in land-use practice, and competition for resources has increased contact between wildlife and humans. It has also introduced human-pathogens to wild species such as Mycobacterium tuberculosis in mongooses of Botswana. The resulting mortality in mongooses has been near-extinction threatening.

Increased Emissions 
Globalization is criticized for its role in increasing carbon dioxide emissions. The increased volume of international trade increases energy consumption as seen in a 2001 study revealing a relationship between economic globalization and trade openness leads to energy consumption and  emissions. International trade relies on various means of transportation including trains, trucks, planes, boats, and ships, each emitting a large quantity of emissions. The development of the transportation sector has greatly contributed to the rise of greenhouse gas; the transportation sector in the United States alone emits 1.9 billion tons of  annually. The farther a good travels, the more fuel is burned, releasing . These emissions contribute to climate change, ocean acidification, and decreased biodiversity.

Moreover, the good being traded is created using electricity and intermediate goods, which are oftentimes products from international trading. In 2018, countries under the Regional Comprehensive Economic Partnership (China, South Korea, Australia, New Zealand, and ten countries of ASEAN) accounted for 39.1% of global  emissions. Through globalization, trade partnerships have been created to facilitate easy international trade for intermediate goods. This ease allows for more goods to be traded internationally for a cheaper export price, encouraging foreign countries to continue transporting goods, and thus increasing  emissions.

Invasive Species 
Globalization intensifies the spread of invasive species through the increase of trade transportation. Today, the development of trading has open trade routes and markets across the globe. The increased methods of transportation allows living organisms to latch on to the shipping containers and travel to a new location where it can grow invasive without the checks and balances present in its natural environment. Rising volumes of air and ship transport are identified as the main source of marine invasions.

Invasive species contribute to economic harm by altering the ecosystem, causing native biodiversity loss, and preventing native plant growth. Scientists say that invasive species creates lasting effects on the environment. A 2006 study found that the invader garlic mustard virtually eliminated all mycorrhizal fungi colonization, which dramatically damaged the ability for native canopy species to regenerate. The invader's antifungal effects reduced the seeding growth of mycorrhizal fungi-dependent plants, and the effects of the garlic mustard were still recorded 2 years after its removal.

Decreased Renewable Resources 
Globalization promotes the transportation of materials from one country to another, allowing more finite resources to be used up. The need for coal in the world is seen through the trade and transportation of the material across the globe. Coal is most desired due to its cheap extraction price, local availability, and necessity in basic items such as steel, concrete, and electricity. In fact, 23% of all electricity in the United States is generated by coal, demonstrating reliance on the resource.

China joined the world trade organization in December 2001 with an average of 2.5 billion tons of coal being supplied each year, and by 2011, their coal usage nearly doubled to 4 billion metric tons. Further examples of increased coal usage due to international trading include India, the United States, and Indonesia. However, coal is not an infinite source of energy. The U.S Energy Information Administration (EIA) estimated in 2020 that the recoverable coal reserves will last 470 years, and the coal produced from mines will last 25 years. As a result of globalization, more resources are being used up in a faster period of time, which will eventually lead to the demise of resources.

Social impacts

Prejudice 
Professor Conor Gearty, of the London School of Economics, has suggested that global freedom of movement, brought on by globalization, has increased the scope for prejudice within societies.

Education 
Globalization creates an incentive for nations to produce individuals who are competitive and marketable. In many countries educational policy and administration has shifted to emphasize efficiency and marketability instead of traditional 'soft' skills. Education is being restructured on market principles - thus, in the realm of higher education, knowledge production and dissemination is becoming commodified. As knowledge management is coming to outweigh labor on the global stage, there is an increasing prevalence of neoliberal economic ideologies. A direct result of this change is the mass privatization of institutions of higher education. Because of privatization and corporatization, public universities are coming to run like for-profit businesses. Thus, universities must find alternative sources of funding, leading to a reliance on the market. Though globalization has increased access to education, in many places it has also made it more unequal in quality.

Psychological impacts

Identity 
The collision between global and local cultures has created challenges in adapting to and reconciling the two. Globalization and the introduction of the Western culture in different countries have shown to produce bicultural identities, identity confusion, and self-selected cultures.

Bicultural identity is defined as one adapting to the global culture while simultaneously being familiar with local traditions. As a result, two identities are formed: global identity and local identity. One's global identity allows one to participate and succeed globally by being able to relate to those outside of one's local sphere. One's local identity allows one to still be relevant to family and friends nearby. Often, those experiencing globalization in their country are seen to develop a hybrid identity in which their global and local identities are merged. This can also be seen with immigrants.

However, adapting to both cultures may be difficult, especially if the distance between the two cultures is great. In these cases, globalization may cause identity confusion, preventing the proper development of identity and self (Erikson's theory of identity formation). Similarly, globalization may create a crisis which John Berry calls “marginalization,” in which one is unable to identify with local culture due to the heavy exposure of globalization and Western influences; however one is also excluded from the global culture as well.

The implementation of globalization requires a certain degree of culture shedding, as global culture alters and disrupts the preexisting local culture. This also leads to identity confusion, primarily in adolescents.

Cultural impacts

Urban and adolescent issues 
Many times, in countries where globalization is introduced, problems that arise among adolescents are often blamed to the intrusion of Western culture and ideals through globalization. Adolescents are most vulnerable and receptive to the introduction of new cultures. Developing countries where Western values and technology have been introduced are more aware of current events taking place in other countries, and adolescents and youths can be seen copying American fashion and music styles. Therefore, Western media is blamed for the rise in premarital sex and teenage pregnancies that follow when globalization is introduced.

Globalization claims to have improved countries’ global status. However, companies attempting to compete globally have exploited workers, and global competition has been achieved through poor working conditions. Furthermore, due to global influences, juvenile crimes have increased because of the disruption of traditional norms.

Arab and Muslim countries 
The Arab and Islamic countries see globalization as an attempt to instill Western superiority and a threat to the preservation of their cultural identity. Although differing views of globalization exist among Arab nations, a large percentage of Muslims see it to be imperialistic and a cultural invasion that attempts to destroy their heritage and cultural beliefs.

Despite the differing opinions of globalization, almost all acknowledge and believe that globalization is simply Americanism— the implementation of American cultures and ideals into other countries.

Globalization is especially threatening to Arab nations because Islam is not simply a religious practice, but it dominates laws and social norms such as marriages and spending habits. Since globalization is seen to be a way of secularizing a nation, Muslims also see it as a cultural and religious invasion, requiring the separation of religion and daily life. Radicalists see it as a perversion of pure Islamic doctrine, as globalization is seen to merge the domain of Islam (Dar al-Islam) and the domain of infidelity (Dar-al-Kufr).

The Western influence on media is also unwelcome. The Western control of media is viewed as a way to brainwash young Muslims to strip them of their nationality and cultural heritage. They also oppose the creation of a new, global, hegemonic culture, referencing  Quran 49:13 which states that God has purposefully divided mankind into different nations and tribes. Arab intellectuals have stated that globalization rids the earth of human cultural diversity and civilizations’ peculiarities, which many see as barbaric. Authors and publishers have expressed fear of Western ideals penetrating their nations.

Language death 
Globalization has been identified as one of the main factors behind language death. Globalization forces languages into unequal interactions with each other where languages of developing countries with many speakers dominate those with fewer speakers and of developing or undeveloped areas. Speakers of minority languages are pressured economically and socially to abandon their languages in favor of global ones such as English, which results in decline and eventual disappearance of numerous cultures and languages worldwide.

Despite the fact that more languages are now declining or dying than ever before, there is a common belief that a reduction in the number of spoken languages can be beneficial to humanity, or that language death should be allowed to take place as a natural process. This belief is rejected by most linguists, such as David Crystal and Martin J. Ball. Ngũgĩ wa Thiong'o denounces the view that language death is either beneficial or necessary as an example of Social Darwinism and cultural colonialism, as language loss leads to breakdown of social bonds, and a loss of one's cultural autonomy, self-identity and connection to one's land and ancestors. According to Max Weber, language establishes a connection to and perception of the material reality of its speaker. Language is a way of "mastering reality", providing intimacy and familitarity with the environment and the surrounding world, and enabling participation in the local community. Therefore, Weber argues that language loss causes a displacement of an entire culture, depriving the affected peoples of their community and way of life. 

Salikoko Mufwene argues that the progressing language loss is not natural, but artificial - the severity of current language loss exceeds the limits of natural language shift. Additionally, natural processes of language shift have been found to progress towards larger amounts of languages, not fewer. Mufwene also notes that language loss is caused by political, economic and social pressures of the dominant language, rather than any natural process. Many regimes had pursued a "one-language policy" that teaches pupils the dominant language only, while discouraging or penalizing the usage of minority or regional languages; examples of such policy include the dialect card in Japan and vergonha in France. Speakers of minority languages experience economic or social discrimination, which only ceases once they abandon their language in favour of the dominant one. Therefore, speakers of a language are pressured into abandoning it, rather than voluntarily doing so. 

David Crystal argues that a global language will fail to bring about peace or global solidarity, listing Vietnam, Cambodia, Rwanda, and Burundi as examples of overwhelmingly monolingual nations that nevertheless experienced frequent wars. He also argues that language is an example of human capital that allows individuals to increase the value of their productivity; being multilingual creates an industry on its own and brings both financial as well as non-financial benefits, such as wider horizons and social acceptance. Crystal also notes that languages strongly influence economy, and are vital to the economic success of many communities; local languages are crucial to tourism industry, arts and local manufacturing. Language is also vital in regards to community cohesion, cultural pride and community self-confidence. Language revitalization can also lead to the revival of the local industry, and Crystal considers languages "the lubricant of trade".

The need to maintain language diversity in face of globalization has also been analysed from the perspective of biodiversity, and many linguists working with endangered languages have adopted an ecological perspective. Crystal argues that since the strongest ecosystems are those which are most diverse, the humanity was able to expand so widely because it developed "diverse cultures which suit all kinds of environments". Therefore language death diminishes the ability to adapt, as the pool of knowledge from which one can draw is reduced. Peter Trudgill sustains that languages as partial barriers to communication are beneficial, as dominant cultures are unable to penetrate smaller so easily. Every language provides a unique way to describe the world, and retains information regarding the "earlier states of mind of its speakers, and the kinds of cultural contact they had" through preserved idioms and ways of speech. Michael E. Krauss equates language death with extinction of a species:

A study of Zayse language in Southern Ethiopia has also established a link between language preservation and biodiversity - language loss has been found to negatively impact the biodiversity conservation. Abayneh Unasho argues that "linguistic diversity and biodiversity cannot be seen in isolation, and should be conserved simultaneously in order to guarantee sustainable bicultural diversity." The language and culture of native peoples promotes a respectful and conservationist attitude towards nature and biodiversity; the fire ecology of Native Americans had created a landscape that European colonists considered "untouched, pristine", unaware that it was the effect of Native American environmental preservation. The land management and the traditional knowledge of the Indigenous peoples is now an important basis for current re-engagement with the landscape and is critical for the correct interpretation of the ecological basis for vegetation distribution.

Cultures and communities, especially indigenous ones, that have lost their language experience heightened negative mental health effects, such as substance abuse, trauma, and depression. A study conducted on Aboriginal youth suicide rates in Canada found that Indigenous communities in which a majority of members speak the traditional language exhibit low suicide rates. Contrary, suicide rates were six times higher in groups where less than half of its members communicate in their ancestral language. Language revitalisation has also been found to spur economic growth, increasing both consumer growth and employment; additionally, Indigenous communities in Australia and Canada whose ancestral language has been revitalised report better quality of life. 

Globalization drives nations to adopt monoligual practices and pressure speakers of minority or marginalized languages to speak the majority language instead. Because globalization entails dominant cultural groups imposing their ways of social, economic and political organization on weaker cultures, Salikoko Mufwene considers it a product of colonization.

See also
Criticism of capitalism
Criticism of neoliberalism
Criticism of the World Bank
Criticism of the World Trade Organization
Development criticism
Disneyfication
Nationalism
New World Order (conspiracy theory)
New world order (politics)

References

Globalization
Anti-globalization movement
Cultural globalization